Chunja's Special Day is a 2008 South Korean drama television series that aired from May 19 to November 13, 2008 on MBC.

Plot
Hwang Chun-ja runs a karaoke bar named "Night Rose" on a remote island, and is a single mother to her daughter, Yeon Boon-hong. Boon-hong is a nursing assistant who works at a public health center in her hometown. When her boyfriend Nam Gi-seok gets her pregnant, he tells her to get an abortion, but she's unable to go through with it. Boon-hong is friends with the couple Lee Joo-young and Lee Sun-hee, and they are all together when Joo-young and Sun-hee lose their lives in a boating accident. Boon-hong survives, but through some misunderstandings, Joo-young's family assumes that she's his girlfriend, not Sun-hee. At the end of her rope, Boon-hong moves into the Lee household to escape her difficulties, letting the family believe that she's carrying Joo-young's child. Joo-young's older brother Lee Joo-hyuk soon finds himself falling for Boon-hong, and she dreads the Lee family finding out the lies that she told.

Cast
Seo Ji-hye as Yeon Boon-hong
Go Doo-shim as Hwang Chun-ja
Joo Sang-wook as Lee Joo-hyuk
Wang Bit-na as Lee Joo-ri
Kim Ki-bum as Park Jung-woo
Yoon Mi-ra as Heo Young-ae
Roh Joo-hyun as Lee Man-seok
Yang Hyun-tae as Lee Joo-young
Kang Nam-gil as Lee Dae-pal
Jung So-hee as Heo Young-ok
Jung Han-heon as Oh Byung-gu
Kim Mi-so as Oh Da-jung
Han Da-min as Park Jung-yeon
Kim Byung-se as Park Dal-sam
Jung Hye-sun as Cha Bok-shim
Im Hyun-sik as Park Tae-sam
Youn Yuh-jung as Yang Boon-hee
Yang Hee-kyung as Park Sam-sook
Choi Ji-yeon as Lee Sun-hee
Heo Jung-min as Nam Gi-seok
Kim Dong-joo as Gi-seok's mother

References

MBC TV television dramas
Korean-language television shows
2008 South Korean television series debuts
2008 South Korean television series endings
South Korean romance television series